In the late 18th century and early 19th century, turnpikes, as opposed to ordinary roads of the same time, were roads where gates barred travelers from continuing and at which payments were demanded for the use of the road. The word "turnpike" itself comes from the fact that these gates, called "pikes," were "turned" once the toll was paid. The privilege of building and operating turnpikes was conferred by the state legislature to "turnpike corporations". Turnpikes were constructed using private capital, were privately owned, and were operated for revenue from toll collection. The turnpike era in Massachusetts began in 1796, when the first act of incorporation for a turnpike was passed. By 1850, most turnpike corporations had either been dissolved or had stopped collecting tolls. In all, 118 acts of incorporation were passed (ten of these were in the territory that later became the state of Maine). Typical toll rates were twenty-five cents for every coach with additional charges of four cents for every man and horse.

List of turnpikes
The following 19th century turnpikes were chartered and built in Massachusetts:

References

Turnpikes
Massachusetts
Turnpikes